A Soldier's Tale is a 1988 New Zealand romantic war film directed and produced by Larry Parr and starring Gabriel Byrne and Marianne Basler. It is based on a novel by M. K. Joseph.

Cast
 Gabriel Byrne as Saul
 Marianne Basler as Bell
 Paul Wyett as Charlie
 Judge Reinhold as The Yank
 Benoît Régent as Father Superior
 Maurice Garrel as M. Pradier
 Jacques Mathou as Woulf
 Bernard Farcy as André

Release 
A Soldier's Tale was first released on 16 June 1988 in New Zealand. It was later released to home video in the United States in 1992.

Reception 
TV Guide reviewed the film, writing that " An interesting but slight character study, A SOLDIER'S TALE highlights the corrupt morality of wartime." A reviewer for The Missoulian was dismissive, as they felt that it was "a talky bore". John Koch of The Boston Globe called it "well-made, tough-minded and memorable".

References

External links
 
 

1988 films
1980s New Zealand films
1988 romance films
Atlantic Entertainment Group films
Films based on New Zealand novels
Films set in France
New Zealand romantic drama films
New Zealand war films
World War II films
1980s English-language films